Chief Running Deer may refer to:

Donald F. Malonson (1917–2003), Wampanoag tribe chief from Aquinnah, Massachusetts
Fred Sasakamoose (born 1933), the first Canadian indigenous player in the National Hockey League (NHL)

See also
 Running Deer (disambiguation)